Guy Twing Seeds (February 2, 1901 – July 24, 1952), sometimes known as "Slippery" Seeds, was a professional football player who played in the National Football League during the 1926 season with the Canton Bulldogs.

Seeds attended Salem High School and was considered one of the best athletes in the city. He later attended Ohio State University and Iowa State University and played for several semi-pro sports teams in addition to one game with the Canton Bulldogs.

Seeds died in July 1952, at the age of 51.

Notes

1890s births
1963 deaths
Players of American football from Pennsylvania
Canton Bulldogs players